A government gazette (also known as an official gazette, official journal, official newspaper, official monitor or official bulletin) is a periodical publication that has been authorised to publish public or legal notices. It is usually established by statute or official action, and publication of notices within it, whether by the government or a private party, is usually considered sufficient to comply with legal requirements for public notice.

Gazettes are published either in print, electronically or both.

Publication within privately owned periodicals
In some jurisdictions, privately owned newspapers may also register with the public authorities in order to publish public and legal notices. Likewise, a private newspaper may be designated by the courts for publication of legal notices. These are referred to as "legally adjudicated newspapers".

See also

List of government gazettes
List of British colonial gazettes
Journals of legislative bodies
Annals
Newspaper of record

External links
 Government gazette of South Africa

References